= Chrisville =

- Location within Gauteng Location within South Africa
- Coordinates: 26°15′30″S 28°01′28″E
- Country: South Africa
- Province: Gauteng
- Municipality: City of Johannesburg
- Main Place: Johannesburg
- Established: 1948

Area
  - Total: 0.33 km^{2} (0.13 sq mi)

Population (2011)
  - Total: 1,133
  - Density: 3,400/km^{2} (8,900/sq mi)

Racial makeup (2011)
  - Black African: 27.6%
  - Coloured: 17.9%
  - Indian/Asian: 20.5%
  - White: 30.7%
  - Other: 3.3%

First languages (2011)
  - English: 57.2%
  - Afrikaans: 16.9%
  - Zulu: 10.1%
  - Sotho: 2.9%
  - Other: 12.8%
- Time zone: UTC+2 (SAST)
- Postal code (street): 2091

Chrisville is a suburb of Johannesburg, South Africa. It is located in Region F of the City of Johannesburg Metropolitan Municipality. A large part of the suburb is currently taken up by a mine dump.

== History ==
The suburb is situated on part of an old Witwatersrand farm called Turffontein. It was established in 1948 and was named after the Chris mine shaft, a Robinson Deep Mine, which was named after a chairman Douglas Christopherson.
